Melbourne is a civil parish in the Derbyshire Dales district of Derbyshire, England. The parish contains 133 listed buildings that are recorded in the National Heritage List for England. Of these, 24 are listed at Grade I, the highest of the three grades, seven are at Grade II*, the middle grade, and the others are at Grade II, the lowest grade. The parish contains the market town of Melbourne, the village of Kings Newton, and the surrounding area.  One of the most notable buildings in the parish is Melbourne Hall, which is listed, and in its gardens are numerous listed buildings, many designated at Grade I, and include lead sculptures by Jan van Nost.  Elsewhere, most of the listed buildings are houses, cottages and associated structures, farmhouses and farm buildings.  The other listed buildings include churches, a market cross and a village cross, a water mill and associated buildings, a road bridge, a railway bridge, a well head, a pair of tombs, a former school, a workshop and a smithy, public houses, a market lamp, a boathouse, almshouses, and cemetery buildings.


Key

Buildings

References

Citations

Sources

 

Melbourne, Derbyshire
Lists of listed buildings in Derbyshire